Gravity Falls: Lost Legends, initially announced as Untitled Mystery Book and later Untitled Gravity Falls Graphic Novel, is a Gravity Falls graphic novel published by Disney Press. Written by Alex Hirsch, the show's creator, the comics in the book are illustrated by various artists, including Asaf Hanuka and Dana Terrace. The comics explores four new adventures taking place within the show's continuity.

First announced at the D23 Expo July 2017, the book was released on 24 July 2018 alongside the complete series box set. Barnes and Noble released a special exclusive edition as well which includes 16 extra pages with behind the scenes production art and drawings from the book. Lost Legends has generally received positive reception from fans, with praise for its "brilliant application" of the comic medium. The book appeared on The New York Times Best Seller list in August 2018.

Plot

Face It
Pacifica Northwest approaches Dipper and Mabel Pines for help to remove a wrinkle for an upcoming photoshoot with her parents. As Dipper rejects to help, Pacifica sneaks into the Shack to view the Journals and summons Mr What’s-His-Face, believing that he can help. Promised to be given a flawless face, Pacifica accepts his deal, but the exchange was interrupted by the twins. In place of Pacifica's, Mr What’s-His-Face steals Mabel's face.

Dipper and Pacifica track the monster into the Crawlspace, a paranormal black market underneath the town. Evading the monsters, they disguised themselves in rubbish. In an argument, they are caught by other monsters and sold to an unknown buyer. While in the burlap sack, Dipper assures Pacifica that she is "more than just a pretty face" after she reveals her insecurity with regard to her appearance.

Finding themselves at Mr What’s-His-Face’s base, the two demand to have Mabel's face back, but he instead steals Dipper's face. Facing a choice on whether to have an everlasting beautiful face or fight him to get back the twins' faces. Pacifica sets Mr What’s-His-Face’s head on fire by tossing the explosive beauty pills at him. The three escape into an outhouse, where their Great-uncle Ford freezes the monster. Briefly panicking that she has little time to clean herself up, Pacifica decides not to care about her appearance and attends the shoot covered in rubbish, much to her parents’ disgust.

Comix Up
Soos brings over his collection of comics to the Shack. However, Grunkle Stan confiscates them, due to his disdain of the medium, and locks them in a cursed chest. A malicious narration box follows Stan around before he is trapped in a comic book. Dipper, Soos, Mabel, Ford and Wendy follow him into the cursed comic book and enter a world of shifting art styles and genres. They chase a mysterious purple-cloaked man, believing that he knows Stan's whereabouts. Managing to corner him, the cloaked guy sets off a bomb that sends everyone flying straight out of the story’s panels and into the margins.

Soos finds a sobbing Stan in a comic Stan drew in his childhood, which was rejected by publishers due to the excessive swear words in the comic. With the failure of his comic, Stan became resentful of the medium. Soos urges Stan to continue his childhood dream and apologise to the cursed chest, but Stan refuses to refer to the medium as "graphic novels". Before they are killed by the narration box, they are rejoined by the others, who defeat the narration box with white-out. Returning back to the real world, Stan reproduces his childhood comic and sells them in the Mystery Shack gift shop.

Don't Dimension It
In an expedition through the forests of Gravity Falls to check for any dimensional rifts in the aftermath of Weirdmageddon, Mabel falls into a wormhole when retrieving her pig Waddles. She ends up in a pocket dimension, along with other lost Mabels of the multiverse. However, as they are too preoccupied with their own tasks, none are able to help her return back to her dimension.

Grunkles Stan and Ford join her through the multiverse. Meanwhile, Mabel meets another Mabel who resembles her and shares her determination to leave the dimension. Both work together to retrieve a flare gun and manage to alert the Grunkles to their location. However, the other Mabel locks Mabel into an outhouse, revealing herself to be the Anti-Mabel, an evil version of her, and intends to take over another Mabel's life and her dimension. The Grunkles, unaware of the switch, pick up the Anti-Mabel. Getting out of the outhouse, Mabel tries to get help from the other Mabels but becomes aggravated when they are too preoccupied too help. Coming to realize how similar to past actions of hers they are, Mabel manages rallies the other Mabels for help in defeating Anti-Mabel.

En route back to their dimension, the Grunkles are overpowered by the Anti-Mabel. Mabel and her other versions arrive, fighting against the Anti-Mabel while rescuing Stan and Ford. The Anti-Mabel is overpowered and the Pines ejects her into space. Dropping the Pines off at the rift leading back to their dimension, the other Mabels thank them for their help before returning to their home dimensions. Upon their return, the Grunkles seal the rift and Mabel apologizes to Dipper for her past mistakes and gives a blue journal with a pine tree on it which she got from Mabipper and hopes to start new adventures together.

Pines Bros Mystery 
This story is also known as The Pines Boys in: The Jersey Devil's in the Details on its title page. Set in the 1960s, young Stan and Ford are excited to spend the whole summer having adventures and working on their new boat, the Stan-O-War, but their dreams are quickly dashed when Stan is accused of stealing their father's gold chain and told he will be grounded for the entire summer. They cut a deal with their father that if they can find the true culprit within 24 hours that will prove Stan's innocence, but otherwise he will be grounded.

Ford analyzes the clues surrounding the crime scene and comes to the conclusion that the chain was stolen by the Jersey Devil, and the two boys set off in search of the cryptid. While stocking up on adventuring supplies, they meet the Sibling Brothers, snooty mystery-solvers who do not appreciate the freakish Pines brothers encroaching on their territory and tell them as much. After being insulted, Stan and Ford head down to the carnival to look for more clues, where they are at first rebuffed by the circus freaks until Ford shows them his own six fingers, whereupon they allow the boys to view a map of the Jersey Devil's hideout tattooed onto the back of one of the performers.

This leads them to the nearby lighthouse, but they aren't allowed inside to investigate further due to Stan's delinquent reputation. To make matters worse, they discover the Siblings Brothers are also on the same trail as them, and the combination makes Stan so angry that he accidentally pushes the brothers off a sand dune. Believing them to be dead, the Pines decide to make the best of it and steal their clothes to impersonate them. They succeed and discover the path to the Jersey Devil's cave.

While separated when exploring the cave, the Sibling Brothers reappear and present Ford with photographic proof that Stan is the one who stole the chain all along. Stan eventually returns with the Jersey Devil behind him. All four boys flee, but when Stan and Ford make it to safety, Ford demands to know the reasons behind Stan's actions. Stan tearfully confesses that he did take the gold chain, but only because he wanted to customize it for Father's Day in the hopes of earning their dad's approval for once, and he panicked when he accidentally broke the glass. Before Ford can reply, the Jersey Devil shows up again, but is captured by the Sibling Brothers, who give Ford the chance of taking credit for finding the monster if he gives them the pictures of Stan stealing the chain back so they can collect the reward — otherwise, they'll frame both Pines twins for the theft. Ford allows Shanklin to attack the brothers and also free the Jersey Devil rather than betray his own brother, and after the humiliated Sibling Brothers call them freaks, they are set upon by the circus folk as Stan and Ford head home. They are then grounded for the summer, but they find it isn't so bad as they have each other.

The story ends with a shot of present-day Stan and Ford on the Stan-O-War II preparing to set sail, and a short ballad detailing some of their misadventures on the seas.

Publication history 
Gravity Falls is an animated television series created by Alex Hirsch. It aired over two seasons, with the finale aired on 15 February 2016. In subsequent interviews about the show, Hirsch mentioned he considered creating comics for the series, using various ideas that were not used for the show as they were considered too short, "weird" or "specific".

The graphic novel was first announced as Untitled Gravity Falls the Graphic Novel at the D23 Expo in 2017, during a shared panel with Star vs. the Forces of Evil. Through an online jigsaw puzzle via Twitter called Puzzling Pines, the cover art for the book was released on February 15, 2018; which also was the 2 year anniversary of the show's conclusion. The book was released on 24 July 2018 as part of a dual merchandise release with the Shout! Factory produced complete series box set, with a estimated sales of 702 copies in the subsequent month.

Lost Legends also contains series of codes that lead to a companion website called "shmeb-you-unlocked". On it, there is additional tie-in content and comics as well as additional codes which are deciphered using a key found within the box set for the series.

Critical response
Gravity Falls: Lost Legends has been generally well-received by fans. In August 2018, the book appeared on The New York Times Best Seller list. It has been praised for its "brilliant application" of the comic medium, especially with one story Comix Up making reference to various art styles of other renowned comics. The four stories have been welcomed as "faithful additions" to the Gravity Falls series and considered "a love letter to the fans from Alex Hirsch himself". Capturing the "charm" of the TV series, the graphic novel includes cryptogram scattered throughout the stories and exploration of morals just like the episodes in the show, with each character "learning something important about themselves" at the end of each story.

Notes

References

External links
 Gravity Falls: Lost Legends at the Disney Books website

2018 graphic novels
Gravity Falls
Comics about comics
Comics about parallel universes
Comics set in Oregon
Comics set in the 1960s
Comics set in the 2010s
Disney Publishing Worldwide
Jersey Devil in fiction
Metafictional comics
New Jersey in fiction
Works about twin brothers
Rick and Morty
Comics based on television series